Sliedrecht Baanhoek is a railway station, in Sliedrecht, Netherlands.

History
The station opened on 16 July 1885, but was closed on 15 May 1938. The station was reopened on 11 December 2011. The station lies on the MerwedeLingelijn (Dordrecht – Geldermalsen) and is located between Dordrecht Stadspolders and Sliedrecht. The station is primarily for western Sliedrecht, Papendrecht and small settlements in the area. Train services are operated by Qbuzz.

Train services

Bicycles are allowed on board for free.

Bus services

References

External links
Qbuzz website 
Dutch Public Transport journey planner 

Railway stations in South Holland
Railway stations opened in 2011
Sliedrecht